The men's event of the 2016 World Allround Speed Skating Championships was held on 5 and 6 March 2016.

Results

500 m
The race was started on 5 March 2016 at 12:30.

5000 m
The race was started on 5 March 2016 at 13:47.

1500 m
The race was started on 6 March 2016 at 13:30.

10000 m
The race was started on 6 March 2016 at 15:28.

Final standings
After all events.

References

Men